The 2017 Tour de France is the 104th edition of the cycle race, one of cycling's Grand Tours. The race started in Düsseldorf, Germany on 1 July, with stage 12 occurring on 13 July with a stage departing from Pau. The race finished on the Champs-Élysées in Paris on 23 July.

Classification standings

Stage 12 
13 July 2017 — Pau to Peyragudes, 

This mountain stage departed east from Pau. With the race starting at Ousse, the peloton continued through Tarbes and headed southeast through Tournay, for the category 4 climb of the Côte de Capvern. Continuing east through La Barthe-de-Neste, the riders took a southeasterly direction from Aventignan, to an intermediate sprint at Loures-Barousse.

Stage 13 
14 July 2017 — Saint-Girons to Foix, 

This mountain stage departed south-east from Saint-Girons. With the race starting outside Lacourt, the peloton continued south through Oust to an intermediate sprint at Seix. After a descent north-east through Burret, the race continued descending east through Saint-Pierre-de-Rivière, to the finish line at Foix.

On Bastille Day, Warren Barguil achieved his first Tour de France stage victory; as a result, he became the first French rider to win on the national holiday since David Moncoutié's stage 12 victory, at Digne-les-Bains, in 2005.

Stage 14 
15 July 2017 — Blagnac to Rodez, 

This hilly stage departed north-west from Blagnac. With the race starting outside Seilh, the peloton continued through Grenade before turning east. After heading through Castelnau-d'Estrétefonds, Villariès and Bessières, an intermediate sprint took place at Rabastens. Continuing north-east through Gaillac and Carmaux, the riders then faced the category 3 climb of the Côte du viaduc du Viaur. Following a false flat and a brief descent was the category 3 Côte de Centrès. The race continued on an undulating route west and then north to a short, steep uphill finish in Rodez.

Stage 15 
16 July 2017 — Laissac-Sévérac-l'Église to Le Puy-en-Velay, 

This hilly stage departed north-east from Laissac-Sévérac-l'Église, with racing starting in the vicinity of Palmas-d'Aveyron. The race then continued north-west, and then north-east through Nasbinals and Malbouzon. The riders then gradually descended through Esplantas-Vazeilles and north to Saint-Arcons-d'Allier, where the route turned east to the valley floor at Prades. The riders then descended through Chaspuzac, before the brief category 4 climb of the Côte de Saint-Vidal. The race continued descending, through Polignac, to the finish line in Le Puy-en-Velay.

Rest day 2 
17 July 2017 — Le Puy-en-Velay

Stage 16 
18 July 2017 — Le Puy-en-Velay to Romans-sur-Isère, 

This hilly-to-flat stage departed east, ascending from Le Puy-en-Velay, with racing starting after passing through Brives-Charensac. The race then partially descended into Le Chambon-sur-Lignon and reascended into Devesset, where the race turned north-east to Saint-Bonnet-le-Froid. After crossing the Rhône into Tain-l'Hermitage, the race then turned north-east to an intermediate sprint at Chantemerle-les-Blés, before eventually turning south-east for Bren. Once through the outskirts of Saint-Donat-sur-l'Herbasse, the route turned south to Châteauneuf-sur-Isère and then south-east to Alixan. From there, the race headed north, through Bourg-de-Péage, to the finish line at Romans-sur-Isère.

Stage 17 
19 July 2017 — La Mure to Serre Chevalier, 

This mountain stage departed east from La Mure. With racing starting at Sousville, the peloton continued through Valbonnais before turning north at Entraigues. After descending east and then north to Saint-Jean-de-Maurienne, the riders continued in the valley south-east to Saint-Michel-de-Maurienne. The route then immediately ascended into the  Hors catégorie Col du Galibier, for the Souvenir Henri Desgrange. The riders then descended south-east through the uncategorised Col du Lautaret, and Le Monêtier-les-Bains, to the finish line at Serre Chevalier.

Stage 18 
20 July 2017 — Briançon to Col d'Izoard, 

This mountain stage departed south-west from Briançon, with racing starting approximately halfway to Saint-Martin-de-Queyrières. The peloton continued south through L'Argentière-la-Bessée and Saint-Clément-sur-Durance, and south-west through Embrun and Savines-le-Lac to the category 3 Côte des Demoiselles Coiffées. The race continued to Le Sauze-du-Lac before turning south-east towards Le Lauzet-Ubaye, and then heading east to an intermediate sprint at Les Thuiles. After passing through Barcelonnette and Jausiers, the riders turned north for Saint-Paul-sur-Ubaye, and then the  category 1 ascent of the Col de Vars, from where the race descended north to Guillestre. The riders then began gradually ascending again, continuing north-east through Arvieux. The route continued north with a  climb to the finish line on the Hors catégorie Col d'Izoard. This was the first stage finish on the Col d'Izoard in Tour history.

Stage 19 
21 July 2017 — Embrun to Salon-de-Provence, 

This undulating stage departed west from Embrun, heading through Chorges and turning south. Following the category 3 , the race descended south-west into Espinasses and immediately ascended into the category 3 Côte de Bréziers, continuing into the uncategorised . After gently descending through La Motte-du-Caire to Sisteron, the route rose towards Saint-Étienne-les-Orgues, where the race took a winding route west for an intermediate sprint at Banon. From there, the race descended south-west through Apt, and turned south to the category 3 . The riders descended to Lourmarin and turned west for Mérindol. After continuing south-west to Lamanon, the race headed south to the finish line at Salon-de-Provence.

Stage 20 
22 July 2017 — Marseille to Marseille, individual time trial (ITT)

Continuing around the Old Port of Marseille to the Museum of European and Mediterranean Civilisations, the riders again doubled back. The route then took the other side of the road around the Old Port before heading inland, with a  climb, to the second time check at Notre-Dame de la Garde. The riders then faced a winding descent back to the Corniche du Président-John-Fitzgerald-Kennedy, before taking the Avenue du Prado and Boulevard Michelet back to the finish line inside the stadium.

Stage 21 
23 July 2017 — Montgeron to Paris Champs-Élysées, 

This flat stage departed north-west from Montgeron, with racing starting before reaching Villeneuve-Saint-Georges. After continuing west to Villeneuve-le-Roi, the peloton headed south-west to Villemoisson-sur-Orge and turned north-west. On reaching Longjumeau, the riders headed north to Montrouge, entered Paris at the Porte d'Orléans and turned west along the southern Boulevards of the Marshals. After crossing the Seine at the Pont du Garigliano, the race headed north along the Voie Georges-Pompidou, crossing back at the Pont des Invalides and quickly crossing for the final time at the Pont Alexandre III. After passing through the Grand Palais, the race then entered the Champs-Élysées. The riders then faced the circuit around the Tuileries Garden, through the Place de la Concorde and around the Arc de Triomphe. The race had an intermediate sprint after the third pass of the finish line, with the race ending after the ninth pass of the finish line.

References

Sources

External links 

2017 Tour de France
Tour de France stages